Druillat is a commune in the Ain department in eastern France.

Population

Health
As of late 2018, the French authorities were investigating the rural area surrounding Druillat because of an unusual cluster of babies born with birth defects.

See also

Communes of the Ain department

References

Communes of Ain
Ain communes articles needing translation from French Wikipedia